Peter Bladen, (1922–2001) was an Australian poet born at Perth. He was later educated at the University of Western Australia, and the University of Melbourne.  He travelled extensively through Australia, working in the 1960s as a journalist and writer, including writing for The Mavis Bramston Show. In the 1980s he moved to Turkey, where he became a Muslim and took the name Yusuf Bladen-Pryor.

His first book, The Old Ladies at Newington, won the Commonwealth Jubilee Literary Prize.

Bibliography

The Old Ladies at Newington (1953)
Masque for a Modern Minstrel (1962)
Millefleurs (2000) (as Yusuf Bladen-Pryor)

References

1922 births
20th-century Australian male writers
20th-century Australian poets
2001 deaths
Australian emigrants to Turkey
Australian male poets
Australian Muslims
Converts to Islam
People educated at Perth Modern School
University of Melbourne alumni
University of Western Australia alumni